The Battle of Sebastopolis was fought at Sebastopolis (mostly identified with Elaiussa Sebaste in Cilicia but also with modern Sulusaray) in 692 CE between the Byzantine Empire and the Umayyad Caliphate under Abd al-Malik ibn Marwan. The battle ended the peace that had existed between the two powers since 680.

The Umayyad army was led by Muhammad ibn Marwan. The Byzantines were led by Leontios and included a "special army" of 30,000 Slavs under their leader, Neboulos. The Umayyads, incensed at the breaking of the treaty, used copies of its texts in the place of a flag. Though the battle seemed to be tilting to the Byzantine advantage, the defection of upwards of 20,000 Slavs ensured a Byzantine defeat. One source states that the Emperor Justinian II massacred the remaining Slavs, including women and children, at the Gulf of Nicomedia, but modern scholars do not consider it a reliable account.

Notes

Sources
 
 
 

Sebastopolis
692
South Slavic history
Sebastopolis
Sebastopolis
690s in the Byzantine Empire
Sebastopolis
Battles in medieval Anatolia
History of Mersin Province
Medieval Cilicia